Westside Torkel Larson (April 18, 1892 – March 7, 1977) was an American Air Force Major general, who was commandant of the Army Air Forces Antisubmarine Command during World War II. In 1933 he won the Mackay Trophy for his pioneering work with "blind flying" whereby pilots could take off and land an aircraft completely with instruments (without any visual cues outside the plane).

Biography
He was born on April 18, 1892, in Vernalis, California. Larson enlisted in the Aviation Section of the Signal Corps Reserve on Oct. 19, 1917 and underwent his flying training at Park Field, Tennessee. He was commissioned a Second lieutenant on May 18, 1918, and subsequently transferred to the Ellington Field in Texas.

In November, 1921, Larson was transferred to 60th Service Squadron at Kelly Field.

He was a member of the Early Birds, a group of pioneering aviators, and an active member of the Sierra Club.

He died on March 7, 1977, at Hollywood Presbyterian Hospital in Los Angeles, California.

References

1892 births
1977 deaths
People from San Joaquin County, California
United States Army generals
United States Army Air Forces generals
Air Corps Tactical School alumni
United States Army Air Service pilots of World War I
United States Army Air Forces personnel of World War II
Recipients of the Distinguished Service Medal (US Army)